Mount Peal is in the Beartooth Mountains in the U.S. state of Montana. The peak is one of the tallest in the Beatooth Mountains, the ninth tallest in Montana and is in the Absaroka-Beartooth Wilderness of Custer National Forest. The nearest taller mountain to Mount Peal is Tempest Mountain,  WNW.

References

Peal
Beartooth Mountains
Mountains of Carbon County, Montana